GMP may refer to:

Finance and economics
 Gross metropolitan product
 Guaranteed maximum price
 Guaranteed Minimum Pension

Science and technology
 GNU Multiple Precision Arithmetic Library, a software library
 Granulocyte-macrophage progenitor
 Guanosine monophosphate, a nucleotide
 Good manufacturing practice
 Graduate Medical Program
 Galápagos Microplate, a geological feature

Transportation
 GmP, a category of mixed train in German-speaking countries
 Gimpo International Airport (IATA code), Seoul, South Korea
 Martin GMP, an American transport aircraft
 Gaobeidian East railway station (telegraph code), China Railway
 Hyundai Electric Global Modular Platform, a platform for electric cars

Organizations and businesses

Government and political organizations
 Ganamukti Parishad, a left-wing movement organization in Tripura
 Global Monitoring Plan, a programme under the Stockholm Convention on Persistent Organic Pollutants
 Gerakan Mansuhkan PPSMI, a Malaysian political lobby
 Greater Manchester Police, England

Publishers of books and music
Gay Men's Press, a British publisher
 Gazza Music Productions, a Namibian music label
 Goody Music Productions, a former Italian music label

Other organizations and businesses
 Gamone Pwint, a Burmese retail conglomerate
 Gerkan, Marg and Partners, a German architectural firm
 Glass, Molders, Pottery, Plastics and Allied Workers International Union, a trade union
 Global Marshall Plan, an environmental plan proposed by Al Gore and an organization created to facilitate that plan
 Good Men Project, a non-profit in New York 
 Group medical practice

Other uses
 Good management practice; See GxP
 Grampian, former local government area of Scotland, Chapman code